Ausobskya is a genus of harvestmen belonging to the family Phalangodidae.

Species:

Ausobskya athos 
Ausobskya brevipes 
Ausobskya hauseri 
Ausobskya mahnerti

References

Harvestmen